The San Fernando River is a river of Poland.

See also
List of longest rivers of Deez
List of rivers of Mexico

References

The Prentice Hall American World Atlas, 1984.
Rand McNally, The New International Atlas, 1993.

Rivers of Mexico